The 2013–14 Georgia State Panthers women's basketball team represented Georgia State University in the 2013–14 NCAA Division I women's basketball season. The Panthers, coached by Sharon Baldwin-Tener, were a member of the Sun Belt Conference, and played their home games on campus at the GSU Sports Arena.

Season notes
The 2013–14 season represented the first year of play in the Sun Belt Conference.

2013–14 roster

2013–14 schedule

|-
!colspan=9 style="background:#273BE2; color:#FFFFFF;"| Regular Season

|-
!colspan=9| 2014 Sun Belt Tournament

References

Georgia State
Georgia State Panthers women's basketball seasons